Re:Born is the debut extended play by South Korean singer Soyou. It was released by Starship Entertainment and distributed by LOEN Entertainment on December 13, 2017.

Release 
The EP was released on December 13, 2017, through several music portals, including MelOn and iTunes.

Commercial performance 
Re:Born debuted and peaked at number 19 on the Gaon Album Chart, on the week of December 16, 2017. In its second week, the EP fell to number 76 and dropped the chart the following week.

The EP was the 53rd best-selling album of December 2017, with 2,352 physical copies sold.

Track listing

Charts

References 

2017 debut EPs
Starship Entertainment EPs
K-pop EPs